Barycnemis is a genus of parasitoid wasps belonging to the family Ichneumonidae.

The genus was first described by Förster in 1869.

The species of this genus are found in Europe and Northern America.

Species:
Barycnemis gracillima
Barycnemis gravipes
Barycnemis harpura

References

Ichneumonidae
Ichneumonidae genera